Tomi Nybäck (born 3 April 1985 in Järvenpää) is a Finnish chess grandmaster and poker player. He won the Finnish Chess Championship in 2008 and is the No. 1 ranked Finnish player as of February 2018.

He played for the Finnish team in the Chess Olympiads of 2002, 2004, 2006, 2008, 2010, 2012 and 2014. He is one of the few players to have a positive lifetime score against World Champion Magnus Carlsen.

Chess career
Nybäck tied for first with Shakhriyar Mamedyarov and Mateusz Bartel in the European Under-18 championship of 2002, taking the bronze medal on tiebreak. In April 2002, he won the First Saturday GM B tournament in Budapest. In 2003 he won the Heart of Finland chess tournament in Jyväskylä.

Nybäck won the Finnish Championship in 2008 with a score of 9/9 points. In the same year he tied for second with Emanuel Berg at the Najdorf Memorial round-robin tournament (category 15, 2608) in Warsaw.

Nybäck tied for second place in the European Individual Chess Championship of 2008 by scoring 8/11, and this result allowed him to qualify for the Chess World Cup 2009. In the 2009 edition, he scored again 8/11, tying for first with other nine grandmasters. At the World Cup Nybäck knocked out Dmitry Andreikin in the first round to reach round two, where he was eliminated by Peter Svidler after tiebreaks.

In 2010, he took part in the Corus B tournament at Wijk aan Zee and scored 5/13.

Notable games
Svetozar Gligoric vs Tomi Nybäck, Rilton Cup 2003-4 2004, Benko Gambit: Accepted (A59), 0-1
Santul Kosmo vs Tomi Nybäck, Rilton Cup 2006, Pirc Defense: General (B07), 0-1
Tomi Nybäck vs Jens Henrichsen, Politiken Cup 2007, English Opening: Anglo-Indian Defense (A17), 1-0
Tomi Nybäck vs Magnus Carlsen, Olympiad 2008, Queen's Gambit Declined: Harrwitz Attack (D37), 1-0

References

External links

Tomi Nyback at 365Chess.com
Rating data for Tomi Nyback
ShakkiNet - Artikkelit-Galleria 
Tomi Nyback Hendon Mob Poker Database

1985 births
Living people
Chess grandmasters
Finnish chess players
Chess Olympiad competitors
People from Järvenpää